Lobio is a traditional Georgian dish of various kinds of prepared beans (cooked or stewed), containing coriander, walnuts, garlic and onion. There are many varieties of lobio, both hot and cold.

History
It is said to have originated in Georgia. While the dish may predate any division of the lands into countries, the most popular variant today uses red kidney beans, which are native to the Americas and introduced into Georgia after 1500. As with many Georgian dishes, lobio is spicy, but not necessarily hot. One of the traditional recipes for lobio does not call for hot peppers (as other recipes do) but relies solely on ground black pepper for its spice.

Preparation and ingredients

While there are many ways of making lobio, the most common of which is a cold dish called lobio nigozit, typically made with dark red kidney beans which are cooked and then mashed with garlic, onions, walnuts, coriander, marigold petals, chili pepper and vinegar, and then allowed to marinate overnight. A hot version is usually made with white beans.

In other hot varieties lobio may contain meat. Beans would be put in the pot with water and spices and allowed to sit overnight. The following day, the pot would be placed over a fire or, if available, in a small exposed oven, and the beans slowly cooked. At the appropriate stages, meat and other vegetables would be added to cook. The cooked lobio would then be served in the clay pot, along with a flat bread.

Lobio, in its traditional format, progressed to become a standard recipe the ingredients of which varied depending on the area in which it was cooked.

See also
 List of legume dishes
 List of stews

References

External links
 Recipe for lobio on the New York Times website, 03-18-1992. Accessed 12-04-2011

Cuisine of Georgia (country)
Stews
Legume dishes